The Salvation Army is the debut album by The Salvation Army, released in 1982.
In the summer of 1982, legal problems with the actual Salvation Army forced the band to change their name. The chosen name, "The Three O'Clock," came from the time of day the band rehearsed.

Track listing
Side A
"She Turns To Flowers" – 2:34
"Upside Down" – 2:11
"The Seventeen Forever" – 1:53
"Mind Gardens" – 2:46
"Grimly Forming" – 3:27
Side B
"While We Were In Your Room Talking To Your Wall" – 3:24
"Minuet" – 1:50
"Happen Happened" – 3:05
"I Am Your Guru" – 2:51
"Going Home" – 1:51

Personnel
Michael Quercio – lead vocals, bass
Troy Howell – drums, kalimba
Louis "Gregg" Gutierrez – guitar, keyboards
H.B. Lovecraft – producer

References

1982 debut albums
The Three O'Clock albums